Luanping County is a county of northeastern Hebei Province, with the Great Wall of China demarcating its border with Miyun District, Beijing to the southwest. The G45 Daqing–Guangzhou Expressway, China National Highways 101 and 112, and the Beijing–Tongliao Railway pass through the county. Other bordering county-level divisions are Fengning County to the northwest, Longhua County to the north, Chengde's core districts of Shuangqiao District and Shuangluan District to the east, and Chengde County to the southeast.

Administrative divisions

The county administers 1 subdistrict, 10 towns, 2 townships, and 8 ethnic townships.

Climate

References

External links

County-level divisions of Hebei
Chengde